Barnaby Rudge is a 1915 British silent drama film directed by Thomas Bentley and Cecil M. Hepworth and starring Tom Powers, Stewart Rome and Violet Hopson. It was an adaptation of the 1841 novel Barnaby Rudge by Charles Dickens which was set amidst the 1780 Gordon Riots in London.

The film was made at Walton Studios by Hepworth Pictures, where Bentley had directed several ambitious Dickens adaptations. The production was considered a lavish spectacle by critics, particularly the restaging on the climatic riots, which involved over 1,500 extras. The sets were designed by the art director Warwick Buckland. The film is now considered lost, although a handful of production stills have survived.

Cast
 Tom Powers as Barnaby Rudge
 Violet Hopson as Emma Haresdale
 Stewart Rome as Maypole Hugh
 Chrissie White as Dolly Varden
 Lionelle Howard as Edward Chester
 John MacAndrews as Geoffrey Haredale
 Henry Vibart as Sir John Chester
 Harry Gilbey as Lord George Gordon
 Harry Royston as Dennis
 Harry Buss as Simon Tappertit
 William Felton as Mr. Rudge
 William Langley as Gabriel Varden

References

Bibliography
 Low, Rachael. ''The History of the British Film 1914 - 1918, Volume 3. Routledge, 2013.

External links
 

1915 films
British historical drama films
1910s historical drama films
1910s English-language films
Films based on works by Charles Dickens
Films set in the 1780s
Films set in London
Films directed by Thomas Bentley
British silent feature films
Hepworth Pictures films
Films shot at Nettlefold Studios
British black-and-white films
1915 drama films
1910s British films
Silent drama films